Tan Sri Dato' Ainuddin bin Abdul Wahid (3 November 1929 – 18 May 2013) was a Malaysian educationist and the first inaugural Vice Chancellor of Universiti Teknologi Malaysia (UTM). He made great contributions to educational institutions in Malaysia. In 2000, he received the Anugerah Maal Hijrah 1421H prominent figure award.

Biography

Early education 
He received his early or lower education at the Teluk Anson (Teluk Intan) Boys Malay School, Perak. Since elementary school, he began to show his interest in engineering, although at that point he did not yet fully understand what the engineering field was. He furthered his studies to the upper secondary level at the Anglo-Chinese School, Ipoh.

Ainuddin graduated with a Bachelor of Science degree in engineering from the Bristol University, United Kingdom in 1956. He then took post-graduate work in Traffic and Road Engineering from Ohio State University in 1962 and was awarded a Fellowship from the International Road Federation, US.

Upon his return from United Kingdom in 1957, Ainuddin served as assistant engineer with the Public Works Department (PWD).

In 1962, he was appointed as an assistant engineer for the Sungai Way-Klang Federal Highway project before rising to the senior executive engineer position in 1965.

Universiti Teknologi Malaysia (UTM) 
Later, in 1969, he transferred from his daily work at Malaysian Public Works Department to the Technical Institute, Kuala Lumpur at the government's request as the institution's Principal.

Death 
Tan Sri Ainuddin Wahid, died at the age of 83 on 18 May 2013 at 5.25 pm local time at his residence in Taman Tunku Abdul Rahman (TAR), Ampang. He left behind his eldest son, Saifuddin and a daughter, Aida. His wife, Puan Sri Rahmah Abdul Hamid, died in 1989.

He is buried at Jalan Ampang Muslim Cemetery located at Jalan Ampang near Kuala Lumpur City Centre.

Awards and recognitions

Honours of Malaysia
  : 
 Member of the Order of the Defender of the Realm (AMN) (1969)
 Companion of the Order of the Defender of the Realm (JMN) (1972)
 Commander of the Order of Loyalty to the Crown of Malaysia (PSM) – Tan Sri (1975)
  :
  Knight Grand Commander of the Order of the Crown of Johor (SPMJ) – Dato’ (1978)

Places and awards named after him
Several places and awards were named after him, including:
 Dewan Tan Sri Ainuddin Wahid , UTM Kuala Lumpur.
 Masjid Jamek Tan Sri Ainuddin Wahid, Taman Universiti, Skudai, Johor Bahru.
 Biasiswa Tan Sri Ainuddin Wahid (Tan Sri Ainuddin Wahid Scholarship).

References 

Malaysian educators
1929 births
People from Perak
Malaysian people of Malay descent
2013 deaths
Commanders of the Order of Loyalty to the Crown of Malaysia
Knights Grand Commander of the Order of the Crown of Johor
Companions of the Order of the Defender of the Realm
Members of the Order of the Defender of the Realm